Paul Hutchison (born 1947) is a New Zealand politician.

Paul Hutchison is also the name of:
Paul Hutchison (English cricketer) (born 1977), English cricketer
Paul Hutchison (Australian cricketer) (1968–2015), Australian cricketer

See also
 Paul Hutchinson (born 1953), English footballer